Garrett Griffith is an American professional wrestler. He is signed to the professional wrestling promotion All Elite Wrestling (AEW), where he performs under the ring name Griff Garrison. Griffith is one-half of the tag team the Varsity Blonds alongside Brian Pillman Jr.

Early life 
Garrison was born in Austell, Georgia, relocating to North Carolina as a youth. He attended North Davidson High School in Welcome, North Carolina, graduating in 2016. While in high school he played American football as a wide receiver. He went on to attend Guilford College in Greensboro, North Carolina, graduating in 2020 with a bachelor's degree in education and history. During his time at Guilford College, he played American football for the Guilford Quakers.

Professional wrestling career 
Garrison was trained by LaBron Kozone, debuting in 2016. He initially wrestled for Fire Star Pro Wrestling in his home state of North Carolina. He also appeared with promotions such as the Georgia-based Anarchy Wrestling and Southern Fried Championship Wrestling, winning a variety of championships. In 2019, he began appearing with Ring of Honor. From 2018 to 2020, Garrison teamed with his former schoolmate Markus Cross as "Master and the Machine".

In June 2020, Garrison began wrestling for All Elite Wrestling (AEW), appearing on AEW Dynamite and AEW Dark as a jobber. In July 2020, he was paired with Brian Pillman Jr., with the duo dubbed the "Varsity Blonds". The duo went on to compete in AEW's tag team division, competing against teams such as FTR, Private Party, Proud and Powerful, and Hybrid 2. In May 2021, they unsuccessfully challenged the Young Bucks for the AEW World Tag Team Championship. In the same month, Julia Hart joined Garrison and Pillman Jr. as their valet. In July 2021, Garrison and Pillman Jr. were signed to contracts with AEW. In December 2021, Garrison and Pillman Jr. began feuding with Malakai Black after he sprayed Black Mist in Hart's eyes; the feud culminated in a tag team bout pitting the Varsity Blonds against the Kings of the Black Throne (Malakai Black and Brody King) on the January 19, 2022 episode of Dynamite that was won by Black and King.

Professional wrestling style and persona 
Garrison's signature moves include the sleeper hold, spear, spinebuster, and Ivy League Destroyer.

Championships and accomplishments 
Anarchy Wrestling
Anarchy Heavyweight Championship (2 times)
Anarchy Tag Team Championship (2 times) – with Ben Buchanan (1 time) and Marcus Kross (1 time)
Fire Star Pro Wrestling
FSPW Heavyweight Championship (3 times)
FSPW Zone1 Platinum Championship (1 time)
Pro Wrestling Illustrated
Ranked No. 280 of the top 500 singles wrestlers in the PWI 500 in 2021
Southern Fried Championship Wrestling
SFCW Heavyweight Championship (1 time)
SFCW Tag Team Championship (1 time) – with Marcus Kross

References

External links 
 
 
 

21st-century professional wrestlers
All Elite Wrestling personnel
American male professional wrestlers
Guilford College alumni
Guilford Quakers football players
Living people
People from Austell, Georgia
Professional wrestlers from Georgia (U.S. state)
Year of birth missing (living people)